Alastair Fraser MacLeod (born 20 October 1960) was a Scottish footballer who played for Dumbarton, Kilmarnock and Raith Rovers.

References

External links

1960 births
Scottish footballers
Dumbarton F.C. players
Raith Rovers F.C. players
Scottish Football League players
Living people
Kilmarnock F.C. players
Association football fullbacks
Association football midfielders
Footballers from Glasgow